Branislav Šoškić (19 November 1922 – 4 April 2022) was a Montenegrin politician who served as the President of the Socialist Republic of Montenegro's Presidency from 1985 to 1986. He was a member of the League of Communists of Montenegro.

Šoškić was born in Gusinje, Kingdom of Serbs, Croats and Slovenes, on 19 November 1922. A noted economist, he was member of the European Academy of Sciences and Arts and the Montenegrin Academy of Sciences and Arts, and served as its President from 1981 to 1985. He ultimately resided in Belgrade, Serbia.

Šoškić died on 4 April 2022, at the age of 99.

References

Sources
 CANU biography

1922 births
2022 deaths
League of Communists of Montenegro politicians
Members of the European Academy of Sciences and Arts
Members of the Montenegrin Academy of Sciences and Arts
Academic staff of the University of Belgrade
Yugoslav Partisans
Montenegrin communists
Presidents of Montenegro
People from Gusinje